Szeged-Csanád Grosics Akadémia is a Hungarian football club located in Szeged, Hungary. The team's colors are black and blue and they play their home matches at the Szent Gellért Fórum. The club, owned by the Roman Catholic Diocese of Szeged–Csanád, was named after the legendary Hungarian goalkeeper Gyula Grosics.

Name changes
2011–2019: Szeged 2011
2019–present: Szeged-Csanád Grosics Akadémia

History
On 28 August 2019, the club's new stadium, Szent Gellért Fórum, was opened with Placido Domingo's concert.

Current squad
As of 5 August, 2022.

Out on loan

See also 
 Szegedi AK

References

External links 
  
 Soccerway

 
Football clubs in Hungary
Association football clubs established in 2011
2011 establishments in Hungary
Sport in Szeged
Organisations based in Szeged